Brenda Mabel May (née Dansie; February 17, 1917 – October 7, 1998) was a New Zealand speleological entomologist known for her contributions to the understanding of weevil larvae biology. Between 1956 and 1980, she worked in the Entomology Division of the Department of Scientific and Industrial Research (DSIR). Afterwards, she became a research associate at Landcare Research, where she completed a systematic overview of New Zealand Curculionoidea, published in 1993. In 1998, May was elected as a Fellow of the Entomological Society of New Zealand in recognition of her contributions.

Selected works

References 

1917 births
New Zealand entomologists
Women entomologists
20th-century New Zealand women scientists
1998 deaths
20th-century New Zealand zoologists
British emigrants to New Zealand
Fellows of the Entomological Society of New Zealand